Wilson E. Callan (born October 8, 1939) is a Canadian politician. He represented the electoral district of  Bellevue in the Newfoundland and Labrador House of Assembly from 1975 to 1979 and 1981 to 1985. He was a member of the Newfoundland Reform Liberal Party and Liberal for his first term and a member of the Progressive Conservative Party of Newfoundland and Labrador for his second.

He was born in Norman's Cove-Long Cove. Callan was first elected to the Newfoundland assembly as a Reform Liberal member. He joined the Liberals in September 1976. Callan stepped aside to allow Liberal leader Don Jamieson to run in Bellevue in the 1979 general election. After Jamieson resigned in 1981, Callan was elected in a by-election. He was elected again in 1982 and 1985. He later joined the Conservatives. Callan did not run for reelection in 1989.

References

1939 births
Living people
Liberal Party of Newfoundland and Labrador MHAs
Progressive Conservative Party of Newfoundland and Labrador MHAs
Newfoundland Reform Liberal Party MHAs